University Ramon Llull (URL) is a private university located in Barcelona, Catalonia, Spain established in 1990. Currently it is formed by several different colleges specialized in different topics, most of which are located in downtown Barcelona.

History 
University Ramon Llull is named after Ramon Llull, a famous writer and philosopher born in the 13th century. University Ramon Llull was founded by four educational institutions to which others were added later on. The URL is composed of:
 ESADE (Escola Superior d'Administració i Direcció d'Empreses) (1958).
 La Salle Engineering and Architecture (1903).
 IQS (Institut Químic de Sarrià) - Chemical Institute of Sarriá (1905) and its two schools: IQS School of Engineering and IQS School of Management
 Blanquerna Foundation (1948).
 Pere Tarrés University School of Social Studies (1998).
 Ebro Observatory Research Institute (1904).
 Vidal i Barraquer Foundation - University Institute of Mental Health (1964).
 Borja Institute of Bioethics (1974).
 ESDi Higher School of Design (1989).
 gave a conference organized by the URL and the Sant Joan de Déu in 1996. Among the promoters of the URL one can find Artur Juncosa Carbonell, later Síndic de Greuges of the university.

Academics 
Ramon Llull University comprises 13 schools and faculties and 3 university institutes:
IQS School of Engineering
IQS School of Management
Blanquerna School of Psychology, Education and Sport Sciences
Blanquerna School of Health Science
Blanquerna School of Communication and International Relations
La Salle Digital Engineering School
La Salle International School of Commerce and Digital Economy
La Salle School of Architecture
ESADE Business School
ESADE Law School
Pere Tarrés Faculty of Social Education and Social Work
Ebro Observatory University Institute
Vidal i Barraquer University School of Mental Health
Borja Institute of Bioethics
ESDi Higher School of Design

University personnel

Notable faculty 

 -economy professor at the Chemical Institute of Sarrià.

Notable alumni 

 Kurt Burneo ( from ESADE Business School)-economy professor at the Pontifical Catholic University of Peru's Centrum Católica.
 Damià Calvet (Degree in Building Sciences and Technologies from Escuela Técnica Superior de Arquitectura La Salle)-Catalan Minister of Territory and Sustainability.
 Ramon Laguarta ( and  '85 from ESADE Business School)-chairman and chief executive officer of PepsiCo.
 Christian Rosa Olmo ( in Advertising Strategies and Creativity from Facultad de Comunicación y Relaciones Internacionales Blanquerna)-Puerto Rican publicist and photographer.
 Albina Ruiz ( in Chemistry)-Peruvian environmentalist and engineer, Ciudad Saludable founder.
 Ester Vilarrubla Escales (Degree in Teaching Sciences from Facultad de Psicología, Ciencias de la Educación y del Deporte Blanquerna)-Andorran Minister of Education and Higher Education.

See also
 Vives Network

References

External links
 

Educational institutions established in 1990
1990 establishments in Spain
Education in Barcelona
University Ramon Llull
Catholic universities and colleges in Spain
Universities in Catalonia